Michael A. Lehman (April 24, 1943 – August 7, 2017) was an American Republican politician from Wisconsin.

Born in Rice Lake, Wisconsin, Lehman graduated from Hartford Union High School in Hartford, Wisconsin. He went to Moraine Park Technical College and Milwaukee Area Technical College. Lehman lived in Hartford, Wisconsin. He worked as a salesman and also worked in hospitals and in road construction. Lehman served in the Wisconsin State Assembly from 1989 until 2005, when he was defeated for re-election in the Republican primary election in 2004. Lehman died in Hartford, Wisconsin.

Notes

1943 births
2017 deaths
People from Rice Lake, Wisconsin
People from Hartford, Wisconsin
Milwaukee Area Technical College alumni
Businesspeople from Wisconsin
21st-century American politicians
20th-century American businesspeople
Republican Party members of the Wisconsin State Assembly